Sporting Life, The Sporting Life or Sportin' Life may refer to:


Film 
 Sporting Life (1918 film), a silent drama film directed by Maurice Tourneur
 Sporting Life (1925 film), a silent comedy-drama film directed by Maurice Tourneur
 Sportin' Life (2020 film), an Italian documentary film

Music 
 Sportin' Life (Mink DeVille album), issued in 1985, is the sixth and final album by the rock band Mink DeVille
 Sportin' Life (Weather Report album), the fifteenth studio album by Weather Report, released in 1985
 The Sporting Life (album), a 1994 album by avante-garde singer Diamanda Galas
 "The Sporting Life," a song on The Decemberists' album Picaresque
 Sporting Life (musician) (born 1983), member of New York City hip hop group Ratking

Other uses
 Sportin' Life, a character in George Gershwin's opera Porgy and Bess
 Sporting Life (retailer), a sporting goods retailer based in Toronto, Ontario, Canada
 Sporting Life (British newspaper), a defunct British racing newspaper
 Sporting Life (American newspaper), a defunct US newspaper

See also
 This Sporting Life (disambiguation)